Paraphlebia quinta is a species of damselfly in the family Thaumatoneuridae. It is found in Central America.

The IUCN conservation status of Paraphlebia quinta is "LC", least concern, with no immediate threat to the species' survival.

References

Further reading

 

Calopterygoidea
Articles created by Qbugbot
Insects described in 1901